This is a list of recessions (and depressions) that have affected the economy of the United Kingdom and its predecessor states. In the United Kingdom and all other EU member states, a recession is generally defined as two successive quarters of negative economic growth, as measured by the seasonally adjusted quarter-on-quarter figures for real GDP.

See also
 List of recessions in the United States
 List of stock market crashes and bear markets
 Office for National Statistics

References

External links

Office for National Statistics website
ONS quarterly GDP growth
UK National Income, Expenditure and Output
Latest Bank of England inflation report (PDF sections) 
Bank of England February 2009 Quarterly inflation report  - Much data, including (on p20) previous 3 UK recessions.
"What is the difference between a recession and a depression?" Saul Eslake November 2008
UK economy tracker  BBC News - comparison of UK recessions - updated quarterly

Recession

Financial crises
Recessions
Recessions
Financial history of the United Kingdom